The Chalon people are one of eight divisions of the Ohlone (Costanoan) people of Native Americans who lived in Northern California. Chalon (also called Soledad) is also the name of their spoken language, listed as one of the Ohlone (alias Costanoan) languages of the Utian family. Recent work suggests that Chalon may be transitional between the northern and southern groups of Ohlone languages.

The original Chalon homeland area is the subject of some local controversy. Initial studies in the early twentieth century placed them in the portion of the Salinas Valley that surrounds the modern town of Soledad, as well as in the adjacent lower Arroyo Seco area to the west and Chalon Creek are to the east. In contrast, a late twentieth century study gives the Spanish-contact period Chalon people the rugged Coast Range valleys centered farther to the east, including upper Chalon Creek, the San Benito River east of the Salinas Valley, and the small creeks around San Benito Mountain. The latter study assigns most of that Salinas Valley area to the Eslenajan local tribe of Esselen speakers.

Specific Chalon material culture was never documented, but beyond doubt it was a hunter-gatherer culture based upon deer and acorn harvest, typical of the ethnographic California culture area. Chalon territory was bordered by the Mutsun (another Ohone division) to the east, Rumsen (another Ohlone division) to the north, Esselen in the Salinas Valley to the west, Salinan to the south, and Yokuts in the San Joaquin Valley to the east.

During the era of Spanish missions in California, the Chalon people's lives changed with the founding of Mission Nuestra Señora de la Soledad in 1791. Most Chalon speakers were forced into the mission between 1795 and 1814, where they were baptized, lived and educated to be Catholic neophytes, also known as Mission Indians. At Mission Soledad many Chalon married local Esselen speakers, while others married Yokuts who were brought into the mission between 1806 and 1834. The Soledad mission was discontinued by the Mexican Government in 1835 during the period of secularization, at which time the survivors scattered. Most went to work on the farms and ranches of west-central California, while many with Yokuts ancestry moved east into the San Joaquin Valley.

Chalon mobile bands and villages
The term Chalon was documented by the Franciscan priests in their Mission Soledad ecclesiastical records. The term definitely applied to a region, since individuals were baptized from specific villages such as "Ponojo del Chalon" and "Zusotica del Chalon." Anthropologist A.L. Kroeber, who first mapped the Chalon language area, presumed that it entirely surrounded Mission Nuestra Señora de la Soledad on the Salinas River; he mapped the specific village of Wacharo-n adjacent to the mission itself. A recent alternative analysis places the Eslenajan local tribe of Esselen language speakers as the inhabitants of the Soledad vicinity at the founding of the mission, places the Guachirron local tribe as Rumsen speakers farther north near Monterey Bay, and places the villages of Chalon to the east of the Salinas Valley.

Notes

References 

 Gordon, Raymond G., Jr. (ed.), 2005. Ethnologue: Languages of the World, 15th edition. Dallas, TX: SIL International. 
 Kroeber, Alfred L. 1925. Handbook of the Indians of California. Washington, D.C: Bureau of American Ethnology Bulletin No. 78. (map of villages, page 465)
 Merriam, C. Hart. Village Names in Twelve California Mission Records, assembled and edited by Robert F. Heizer. Reports of the University of California Archaeological Survey Number 74. Department of Anthropology, University of California at Berkeley, 1968.
 Milliken, Randall. A Time of Little Choice: The Disintegration of Tribal Culture in the San Francisco Bay Area 1769–1910 Menlo Park, CA: Ballena Press Publication, 1995.  (alk. paper)
 Milliken, Randall. Ethnohistory of the Rumsen. Papers in Northern California Anthropology No. 2. Salinas, CA: Coyote Press, 1987.
 Teixeira, Lauren. The Costanoan/Ohlone Indians of the San Francisco and Monterey Bay Area, A Research Guide. Menlo Park, CA: Ballena Press Publication, 1997. .

External links
 Chalon language overview at the Survey of California and Other Indian Languages

Ohlone
California Mission Indians
Native American tribes in California
History of Monterey County, California
Salinas Valley